Giuffria is the self-titled debut album from American rock band Giuffria (led by keyboard player Gregg Giuffria), released on MCA Records in 1984, and co-produced by Andy Johns. The album peaked at #26 on the Billboard album charts on March 2, 1985. It was the most successful album from the five released by Giuffria, then House of Lords, from 1984 to 1992.  The debut single from the album, "Call to the Heart" reached the top 15 on the Billboard Hot 100.

Track listing
All songs written by David Glen Eisley and Gregg Giuffria, except where noted.
 "Do Me Right" 4:12
 "Call to the Heart" 4:37
 "Don't Tear Me Down" (Eisley, Giuffria, Goldy) 4:54
 "Dance" (Eisley, Giuffria, Goldy) 4:08
 "Lonely in Love" 4:53
 "Trouble Again" 5:24
 "Turn Me On" (Eisley, Giuffria, Goldy) 4:25
 "Line of Fire" 4:56
 "The Awakening" 2:34
 "Out of the Blue" 5:32

Personnel

Giuffria
David Glen Eisley – lead vocals, keyboards, harmonica
Craig Goldy – guitars
Gregg Giuffria – keyboards, backing vocals
Chuck Wright – bass, backing vocals
Alan Krigger – drums, percussion

Additional musicians 
Rick Bozzo (Former bassist for Sabu)
Jim Cypherd - Fairlight CMI programming
Phil Jost - programming

Production 
Produced By Andy Johns & Gregg Giuffria
Associate Producer: Lee DiCarlo
Engineers: Lee DiCarlo, Andy Jones
Assistant Engineer: Jim Scott
Mixing: Andy Johns, Jim Scott
Mastering: Brian Gardner

Chart performance
The album spent 29 weeks on the U.S. Billboard album charts and reached its peak position of #26 in early March 1985.

References

Giuffria albums
Albums produced by Andy Johns
MCA Records albums
1984 debut albums